I Still Have a Pony is the second live comedy album by Steven Wright.  The title is a play on that of Wright's previous album I Have a Pony, which was released 22 years before. The album contains the audio from his Comedy Central standup comedy special When the Leaves Blow Away. Wright claims to have come back with a new album and special because "the people in college now weren't even born or were like five years old when I did my last HBO special."

Like its predecessor, the album was nominated for the Grammy Award for Best Comedy Album.

Track listing 
 "Quote" - 4:56
 "I Met This Woman" - 4:06
 "The Store" - 4:18
 "Camera" - 4:23
 "The Kitten Song" - 1:08
 "Twin" - 3:12
 "Monopoly" - 3:33
 "Hitchhiker" - 3:15
 "Planetarium" - 2:49
 "My Grandfather" - 3:01
 "Shopping Carts" - 2:16
 "The Mumbles Song" - 2:02
 "Friends of Mine Song" - 3:11

References

Steven Wright albums
Stand-up comedy albums
2007 live albums
Comedy Central Records live albums
2000s comedy albums